is a Japanese enka singer. He has one major hit with "Sapporo Elegy" in 2001. On December 30, 2021, Takeshima won the Japan Composer's Association Award at the 63rd Japan Record Awards.

Albums 
 First
 Best Selection

References 

1978 births
Enka singers
Living people
Musicians from Fukui Prefecture
21st-century Japanese singers
21st-century Japanese male singers